Silk City is a British-American supergroup duo composed of electronic music producers Mark Ronson and Diplo. The duo have collaborated with artists including Dua Lipa, Daniel Merriweather, Mapei, GoldLink, Ellie Goulding and Desiigner.

History
On 2 January 2018, American DJ and record producer, Diplo, and English-American musician, DJ, songwriter and record producer, Mark Ronson, announced a new project entitled Silk City. The duo released their debut single "Only Can Get Better" featuring Daniel Merriweather on May 25, 2018. Their second single, "Feel About You" featuring Mapei, was released on July 20, 2018. The duo's third single, "Loud", saw Diplo reunite with previous collaborators GoldLink and Desiigner.

Their fourth single "Electricity" was released on 6 September 2018 and features British singer and songwriter Dua Lipa. The music video was released on the same day.

On 22 January 2021, Silk City released the single "New Love" featuring British singer-songwriter Ellie Goulding.

Discography

Extended plays

Singles

Remixes

Awards and nominations

Grammy Awards

International Dance Music Awards

Notes

References

External links
 
 

Diplo
Electronic dance music duos
Electronic music supergroups
Grammy Award winners
Grammy Award winners for dance and electronic music
Male musical duos
Musical collectives
Musical groups established in 2018
Columbia Records artists
Sony Music artists